The siege of Ambur (10 November – 7 December 1767) was conducted by a combined force of Mysorean and Hyderabadi troops under the command of Hyder Ali against the town of Ambur in southern India during the First Anglo-Mysore War.  The town was successfully defended by a garrison of local troops and a small force of British East India Company troops under the command of Captain Calvert.

References

 Illustrated Naval and Military Magazine, Volume 1

Conflicts in 1767
1767 in India
Sieges involving the British East India Company
Sieges involving Great Britain
Sieges involving the Kingdom of Mysore
Sieges involving the Indian kingdoms
Siege of Ambur 1767